Timiskaming (later known as Timiskaming—French River) was a federal electoral district in the northeastern part of Ontario, Canada, that was represented in the House of Commons of Canada from 1917 to 1925, and from 1935 to 1997.

It was created in 1914 from parts of Algoma East and Nipissing ridings.

Territorial evolution

The riding generally covered the Timiskaming District, but also incorporated parts of Nipissing District, Sudbury District, Algoma District and Cochrane District at various times.

In 1914, it consisted of the whole of the territorial district of Timiskaming and part of the territorial district of Algoma.

The electoral district was abolished in 1924 when it was divided into Timiskaming North and Timiskaming South ridings.

In 1933, the two ridings were re-united, and the new Timiskaming riding consisted of the territorial district of Timiskaming (excluding the township of Keefer and all townships east of Keefer and adjacent to the north boundary of Timiskaming district); and part of the territorial district of Nipissing. In 1947 and 1952, it was redefined to consist of the southern part of Timiskaming.

In 1966, it was redefined to consist of parts of the territorial districts of Timiskaming, Sudbury and Nipissing. In 1976, it was redefined to consist of the southeastern part of the Territorial District of Cochrane, the northern part of the Territorial District of Nipissing; and the Territorial District of Timiskaming (excluding that part lying westerly of the Townships of Cleaver and Fallon).

In 1987, it was redefined to consist of the southeastern part of the Territorial District of Cochrane; the northern part of the Territorial District of Nipissing; the eastern part of the Territorial District of Sudbury; and the Territorial District of Timiskaming (excluding the part lying west of the west boundary of the geographic Townships of Cleaver and Fallon.)

The electoral district was renamed in 1993 to "Timiskaming—French River", and abolished in 1996 when it was incorporated into Timiskaming—Cochrane riding.

Members of Parliament

Election results

Timiskaming, 1917–1925

|- 
  
|Government (Unionist)
|Francis Cochrane
|align="right"|7,025
  
|Opposition
|Arthur Roebuck
|align="right"|4,868

|-
 
|Independent
|Angus McDonald 
|align="right"|5,797   
  
|Liberal
| Arthur Graeme Slaght
|align="right"| 3,090 
 
|Independent Conservative
|Ernest Fleetwood Pullen
|align="right"|2,996 

|-
 
|Independent
|Angus McDonald 
|align="right"| 5,797    
  
|Liberal
| Donald McEachren 
|align="right"|5,703 
  
|Conservative
| Angus John Kennedy
|align="right"|5,130    
 
|Independent
|David Bertrand
|align="right"|197

Timiskaming, 1935–1993

|-
  
|Liberal
|Walter Little
|align="right"|5,905 
  
|Conservative
|Wesley Ashton Gordon
|align="right"|5,456 
 
|Co-operative Commonwealth
|Walter John Hill
|align="right"|4,185    

|-
  
|Liberal
|Walter Little
|align="right"|10,455
  
|Liberal
|Gerald Daniel O'Meara
|align="right"|4,906 
 
|Farmer–Labour
|Tommy Church
|align="right"|4,204   
 
|Co-operative Commonwealth
|Walter John Hill
|align="right"|2,481 
 
|Unknown
| Albert Edward Swift
|align="right"|110   

|-
  
|Liberal
|Walter Little 
|align="right"|7,818 
 
|Co-operative Commonwealth
|Colborne Campbell Ames
|align="right"|6,330   
  
|Progressive Conservative
| Frank Herbert Todd
|align="right"|4,373 

|-
  
|Liberal
|Walter Little
|align="right"| 8,528 
 
|Co-operative Commonwealth
| Colborne Campbell Ames
|align="right"|6,961    
  
|Progressive Conservative
|John Fenton Richardson Akehurst
|align="right"|5,512    

|-
  
|Liberal
|Ann Shipley
|align="right"|7,497 
 
|Co-operative Commonwealth
|Colbert Campbell Ames
|align="right"|6,259   
  
|Progressive Conservative
|Ted Kenrick
|align="right"|4,611   

|-
 
|Co-operative Commonwealth
|Arnold Peters
|align="right"|6,936   
  
|Liberal
|Ann Shipley 
|align="right"|6,896 
  
|Progressive Conservative
|C. Foster Rice
|align="right"|5,645   

|-
 
|Co-operative Commonwealth
|Arnold Peters
|align="right"|7,544   
  
|Progressive Conservative
|C. Foster Rice
|align="right"|7,318    
  
|Liberal
|Ted J. Miron
|align="right"|6,118    

|-
 
|New Democratic
|Arnold Peters
|align="right"|7,055   
  
|Progressive Conservative
| Joseph Mavrinac
|align="right"|6,053   
  
|Liberal
|Ann Shipley
|align="right"|5,969 

|-
 
|New Democratic
|Arnold Peters
|align="right"|7,356   
  
|Liberal
|Mervyn Lavigne
|align="right"|6,763 
  
|Progressive Conservative
| John Cram
|align="right"| 5,540 

|-
 
|New Democratic
|Arnold Peters  
|align="right"| 9,986  
  
|Liberal
|Mervyn Lavigne
|align="right"| 5,885 
  
|Progressive Conservative
| Bruce Besley 
|align="right"|3,823 

|-
 
|New Democratic
|Arnold Peters
|align="right"| 8,482 
  
|Liberal
|Louis-R. Vannier
|align="right"| 7,728 
  
|Progressive Conservative
|George L. Cassidy
|align="right"|4,443 

|-
 
|New Democratic
|Arnold Peters
|align="right"|11,327   
  
|Liberal
|Dick Duff 
|align="right"|7,768 
  
|Progressive Conservative
| Alf Guppy 
|align="right"|3,317 

|-
 
|New Democratic
|Arnold Peters
|align="right"|10,263  
  
|Liberal
|Guy Iannucci
|align="right"|6,598 
  
|Progressive Conservative
|Murray Watts 
|align="right"| 4,615

|-
 
|New Democratic
|Arnold Peters
|align="right"| 11,595 
  
|Liberal
|Pierre Belanger 
|align="right"| 10,900
  
|Progressive Conservative
|Grant Sirola
|align="right"| 6,036   

|-
  
|Liberal
|Bruce Lonsdale
|align="right"| 11,135 
 
|New Democratic
|Arnold Peters 
|align="right"|10,661  
  
|Progressive Conservative
|Grant Sirola 
|align="right"|4,901 

|-
  
|Progressive Conservative
|John MacDougall
|align="right"|15,359 
 
|New Democratic
| Jim Morrison 
|align="right"|  6,685 
  
|Liberal
|Lorraine Robazza
|align="right"|  6,308 

|-
  
|Progressive Conservative
|John MacDougall
|align="right"|11,230    
  
|Liberal
|Ben Serré 
|align="right"|10,284
 
|New Democratic
| Earl Evans
|align="right"| 7,831  

 
|Independent
|Richard Peever
|align="right"| 160

Timiskaming—French River, 1993–1997

|-
  
|Liberal
|Ben Serré 
|align="right"| 17,462 
  
|Progressive Conservative
|Bob   Mantha
|align="right"| 4,510 

 
|New Democratic Party
|Steve Yee
|align="right"| 2,573  
 
|Independent
|Gary   Whitman
|align="right"|483 
  
|Natural Law
|Anne   Belanger
|align="right"| 296

See also 

 List of Canadian federal electoral districts
 Past Canadian electoral districts

External links 

Riding history from the Library of Parliament:
Timiskaming, Ontario (1914 - 1924)
Timiskaming, Ontario (1933 - 1993)

Former federal electoral districts of Ontario